James Fred "Red" Bennett (March 15, 1902 – May 12, 1957) was a Major League Baseball right fielder who played with the St. Louis Browns in  and the Pittsburgh Pirates in .

He made his Major League debut at the age of 26 on April 13, 1928, and played his last game on July 28, 1931.

References

External links

1902 births
1957 deaths
Major League Baseball right fielders
Baseball players from Arkansas
Pittsburgh Pirates players
St. Louis Browns players
Nashville Vols players